Southeast Island School District (SISD) is a school district headquartered in Thorne Bay, Alaska.

Schools
 Howard Valentine Coffman Cove School
 Hollis School
 Hyder School
 Barry C. Stewart Kasaan School
 Naukati School
 Port Alexander School
 Thorne Bay School
 Whale Pass School

References

External links
 

Prince of Wales–Hyder Census Area, Alaska
School districts in Alaska